Sofiya Olegovna Palkina (born 9 June 1998) is a Russian female hammer thrower, who won an individual gold medal at the 2015 World Youth Championships and at the 2019 European Athletics U23 Championships.

References

External links

1998 births
Living people
Russian female hammer throwers
Authorised Neutral Athletes at the World Athletics Championships